Paul Grassot (simply known as Grassot, born Jacques Antoine Grassot in Paris on September 16, 1799 (or 1800 or 1804), where he died on January 18, 1860) was a French stage actor.

Biography 
He spent his entire career at the Palais-Royal theatre. His eccentric acting, his hoarse voice and his buffoonish pantomime made him one of the most applauded comedians in Paris.

In May 29, 1852 (some sources say earlier) he married his colleague Françoise Billiard, known under the name of Madame Grassot, in Paris.

Started at the Palais-Royal in 1838. Entered the Gymnasium in 1833, with his wife.

Henry Lyonnet gave him the first name of Paul (an error which has been perpetuated), while Edmond-Denis de Manne clearly indicates in the baptismal extract the first names of Jacques Antoine. However the latter quotes an act of 22 Nivôse year VIII (January 12, 1800), while the reconstituted civil status of Paris only includes one form on the date of September 16, 1799. This may also relate to different dates given for his birth and marriage.

Theatre Credits 
Selected credits listed below.

 1838: Monsieur de Coyllin or the Infinitely Polite Man by Eugène Labiche , Auguste Lefranc and Marc-Michel , Palais-Royal theater: M. de Coyllin
 1839: Les Avoués en vacances , comedy-vaudeville in 2 acts by Bayard and Dumanoir , Palais-Royal theater: Zurich and Francine
 1843: Les Hures-Graves by Dumanoir, Clairville and Paul Siraudin , Palais-Royal theater: Job aged 300
 1844: Deux papas très bien ou la Grammaire de Chicard by Eugène Labiche and Auguste Lefranc, Palais-Royal theater: Tourterot
 1845: Le Roi des Frontins by Eugène Labiche, Auguste Lefranc, Palais-Royal theater: Fayensal
 1845: The Truancy of Eugène Labiche, Palais-Royal theater: Provins
 1845: The Sick Potatoes by Clairville and Dumanoir], Palais-Royal theater: Boudin's son
 1846: Mademoiselle ma femme by Eugène Labiche, Auguste Lefranc, Palais-Royal theater: Naquet
 1847: A burning fever by Mélesville and Nezel , Palais-Royal theater: the count of Renardoff
 1848: A sentimental journey by Charles Varin , Leuven and Brunswick , Théâtre du Palais-Royal
 1848: An English channel by Eugène Labiche, Palais-Royal theater: Charençon
 1848: A tragedy at the home of M. Grassot by Eugène Labich and Auguste Lefranc, Théâtre du Palais-Royal: Ulysse
 1849: The Headlines of a Villain by Eugène Labiche and Saint-Yves, Palais-Royal theater: Sangredino
 1849: Trompe-la-ball by Eugène Labiche and Auguste Lefranc, Palais-Royal theater: Crémuffendorf
 1849: Exhibition of products from the Republic by Eugène Labiche, Dumanoir and Clairville, Palais-Royal theater: a bousingot and a socialist
 1849: The godmothers of the year three of Dumanoir and Clairville, Palais-Royal theater: Soulouque
 1850: Bolster and Cover by Eugène Labiche and Charles Varin, Palais-Royal theater: Salvador
 1850: Le Sopha by Eugène Labiche, Mélesville and Charles Desnoyer , Palais-Royal theater: the Marquis de Haute-Futaie
 1850: The Well-Guarded Girl by Eugène Labiche and Marc-Michel, Palais-Royal theater: Saint-Germain
 1850: A ball in a dressing gown by Eugène Labiche and Marc-Michel, Palais-Royal theater: The viscount of Vert-Gazon
 1851: Mam'zelle makes her teeth with Eugène Labiche and Marc-Michel, Palais-Royal theater: Turpin
 1851: An Italian straw hat by Eugène Labiche and Marc-Michel, Palais-Royal theater: Nonancourt
 1851: Martial, the heartbreak of Mélesville, Palais-Royal theater: Pipelet 
 1852: Maman Sabouleux by Eugène Labiche and Marc-Michel, Palais-Royal theater: Sabouleux
 1852: Les Coulisses de la vie , comedy-vaudeville in 5 acts by Dumanoir and Clairville, Palais-Royal theater: Saint-Martin
 1852: Mon Isménie by Eugène Labiche and Marc-Michel, Palais-Royal theater: Dardenbœuf
 1853: A chest C by Eugène Labiche and Auguste Lefranc, Palais-Royal theater: Fridolin
 1853: The Raven Hunt by Eugène Labiche and Marc-Michel, Palais-Royal theater: Montdouillard
 1853: A flying hat from Delacour and Morand: Jobinard
 1854: Spaniards and Boyardinos by Eugène Labiche and Marc-Michel, Palais-Royal theater: Crétinowitch
 1855: La Perle de la Canebière by Eugène Labiche and Marc-Michel, Palais-Royal theater: Beautendon
 1855: Les Précieux by Eugène Labiche, Marc-Michel and Auguste Lefranc, Palais-Royal theater: Carolus de Valtravers
 1856: La Fiancée du bon coin by Eugène Labiche and Marc-Michel, Palais-Royal theater: Dindard
 1856: La Queue de la poële by Paul Siraudin, Alfred Delacour and Lartigue: King Kaperdulaboula 
 1856: A gentleman who burned a lady by Eugène Labiche and Auguste Anicet-Bourgeois  : Loiseau
 1856  : A ball of Auvergnats by Paul Siraudin, Alfred Delacour and Lambert-Thiboust , Théâtre du Palais-Royal
 1856  : La Queue de la poële by Paul Siraudin and Alfred Delacour, Palais-Royal theater
 1857: The Wedding at Bouchencœur by Eugène Labiche, Albert Monnier and Édouard Martin , Palais-Royal theater: Bouchencœur
 1858: Le Punch Grassot by Eugène Grangé and Alfred Delacour, Palais-Royal theater
Another list of credits from another source (might be some overlap) below.

Note 

 ↑ It was Henry Lyonnet who first gave him the first name of Paul (an error which has been perpetuated), while Edmond-Denis de Manne clearly indicates in the baptismal extract the first names of Jacques Antoine . However the latter quotes an act of 22 Nivôse year VIII (January 12, 1800), while the reconstituted civil status of Paris only includes one form on the date of September 16, 1799...
 ↑ Paris, Reconstructed civil status, view 11/26.  [ archive ]
 ↑ Death record in Paris 1 st , 14/21 view.  [ archive ]
 ↑ Paris, Reconstructed civil status, view 20/49.  [ archive ]
 ↑ Portrait of Grassot in the role of Pipelet by Lhéritier  [ archive ] read online at Gallica .
 ↑ Portrait of Grassot in the role of Kaperdulaboul by Lhéritier  [ archive ] read online on Gallica .

References

External links 

 Virtual International Authority File (Virtual International Authority File)
 ISNI - International Standard Name Identifier (ISNI - International Standard Name Identifier)
 IdRef - Grassot, Paul Louis Auguste (1800-1860; actor)
 Paul Grassot (Paul-Louis Auguste Grassot) on Les Archives du Spectacle - A search engine for the performing arts

French stage actors